Florence Andiru Nebanda, commonly known as Florence Nebanda, is a Ugandan politician and Legislator. She is the Woman Member of Parliament, representing Butaleja District in the Parliament of Uganda. She was elected to that position in February 2013, replacing her younger sister, Cerinah Nebanda, who died in office in December 2012. In 2021, she was re elected to the same position.

Background and education
She is the firstborn of the family of eight children (one boy and seven girls) and she was born in Entebbe, on 9 October 1986 to the late Peter Waiga and Alice Namulwa. She attended Ugandan schools until Senior six completing her UACE from Katikamu SDA Secondary School in Wobulenzi, Luwero district in 2013. She relocated to the United Kingdom to pursue further studies. She returned to Uganda when her sister Cerinah Nebanda died in December 2012. She is reported to hold the BA in Human Resources Management  attained from the University of East London  in 2008 and a MA in International Human Resources Management, from the University of Bedfordshire in the United Kingdom.

Career
On 14 December 2012, Cerinah Nebanda, the elected Member of Parliament for the Butaleja Women's Constituency died suddenly, rendering that position vacant. In the by-election to fill her seat, her elder sister, Florence Andiru Nebanda won on the National Resistance Movement political party ticket. She will serve the remainder of that term until the general elections of March 2016. She was also a member of the Budget and Presidential Affairs Committee.

Personal life 
Nebanda loves netball as one of her hobbies, her being  part of the parliamentary Netball Competition while in the 9th parliament. She also reads novels and the Bible.

See also
 Parliament of Uganda
 Butaleja District
Member of Parliament.
National Resistance Movement
List of members of the eleventh Parliament of Uganda
List of members of the ninth Parliament of Uganda
Index of Uganda-related articles

References

External links
Website of the Parliament of Uganda
 MP Nebanda Speaks Out On Kyankwazi Fight With A Colleague
 Uganda Paid US Public Relations Firm 'to clean up image' After Anti-Gay Bill

1986 births
Living people
Members of the Parliament of Uganda
Women members of the Parliament of Uganda
People from Butaleja District
National Resistance Movement politicians
21st-century Ugandan women politicians
21st-century Ugandan politicians